"The Kids Aren't Alright" is a song by the Offspring. It is the fifth track from the band's fifth studio album, Americana (1998), and was released as its third single. It became another top 10 hit on the US Modern Rock Tracks chart.

The song was played over the end credits of Woodstock 99: Peace, Love, and Rage. The song was used in the opening scene of the film The Faculty and appears on the soundtrack album. It is also available as downloadable content for the Rock Band video game series.

Q reported that the song's title is an allusion to the Who song "The Kids Are Alright" (from My Generation). The magazine also argued that the track "borrows heavily" from "Electricity" by Orchestral Manoeuvres in the Dark, and pointed to NOFX's punk rock cover of "Electricity" as evidence.

Composition 
The song lyrics tell the stories of several people from a town and the problems they faced growing up (unplanned pregnancy, unemployment, drug addiction, and suicide). Dexter Holland wrote the song after visiting his home town, Garden Grove, California. Holland said, "You grow up in America, and you're supposed to have a bright future." During his visit he discovered that was not the case for many residents of the town.

Track listing

Original pressing

Alternative pressing

Second alternative pressing

Third alternative pressing

Promo CD

Cassette single

Music video
It features a room with a background of abandonment or family activity at different times. In the center of the room, there are scenes of various persons, including an appearance by Bif Naked, doing stereotypical things and moves; occasionally band members show up. The camera pans around the room and the changing of the scenes of persons constantly morphing and shifting between each other.

The background can be seen shifting between two time lines, one where the scene is the past, where things are new and white, and modern days where it is dreary and drab.

The music video, directed by Yariv Gaber, released a month before the CD single, received heavy airplay on MTV. It was later nominated for Best Direction on the MTV Video Music Awards. The visuals in the video are made with rotoscoping techniques.

DVD appearances
The music video also appears on the Complete Music Video Collection DVD, released in 2004.

Album art
The album art features two different drawings for this song. The first depicts a scarecrow falling into the tentacles shown prominently in other single and album covers from Americana. This art also appeared in the accompanying booklet for the album (however, this drawing appeared with the song "Have You Ever"). The second, alternative cover shows a young child reaching for a gun, with ominous blood near to it (the drawing that appears with the song in the Americana booklet).

Critical reception
"The Kids Aren't Alright" is widely considered one of the Offspring's best songs. In 2012, Loudwire ranked the song number three on their list of the 10 greatest Offspring songs, and in 2021, Kerrang ranked the song number one on their list of the 20 greatest Offspring songs.

Other versions
Live versions of the song were released with "Want You Bad" and "Hit That". A remix (by the Wiseguys) appeared as the b-side to "She's Got Issues" and was later included on the Greatest Hits album. The download version of Splinter (2003) included "The Kids Aren't Alright (Island Style)", an instrumental version of the song featuring ukulele and steel guitar. It is also available on the Enhanced CD version of the album under the folder MP3.

Evergreen Terrace recorded a version of the song for their 2004 covers album, Writer's Block. The same year, the Massachusetts Institute of Technology a cappella group Logarhythms recorded the song for their album Soundproof.  Chris Webby's "Fragile Lives" samples the song's chorus and uses a similar four-chord progression.

Charts

Weekly charts

Year-end charts

Certifications

References

The Offspring songs
1999 singles
Animated music videos
Songs about children
Songs about death
Songs about drugs
Songs about suicide
Songs written by Dexter Holland
Skate punk songs
1998 songs
Columbia Records singles